Walker Brooke (December 25, 1813 – February 18, 1869) was an American politician who served as a Deputy from Mississippi to the Provisional Congress of the Confederate States from 1861 to 1862. He was also a U.S. Senator from 1852 to 1853, representing the state of Mississippi.

Biography
Born on December 25, 1813, in Clarke County, Virginia, Walker Brooke was the son of Humphrey Brooke and Sarah Walker Page. He attended the public schools in Richmond, Virginia and Georgetown, D.C. He graduated from the University of Virginia at Charlottesville in 1835, studied law, was admitted to the bar in 1838 and commenced practice in Lexington, Mississippi. He was a member of the Mississippi House of Representatives in 1848 and was a member of the Mississippi Senate in 1850 and 1852.

Brooke was elected as a Whig to the U.S. Senate to fill the vacancy caused by the resignation of Henry S. Foote and served from February 18, 1852, to March 3, 1853; he was not a candidate for reelection and resumed the practice of law. In 1857 he moved to Vicksburg and continued the practice of law; he was a delegate to the constitutional convention in 1861 and became affiliated with the Democratic Party that year. He was elected a member of the Provisional Congress of the Confederate States from Mississippi in 1861 and served one year; he was then appointed a member of the permanent military court of the Confederate States.

See also
 List of United States senators from Mississippi

External links 
 
 

1813 births
1869 deaths
19th-century American politicians
Burials in Mississippi
Deputies and delegates to the Provisional Congress of the Confederate States
Members of the Mississippi House of Representatives
Mississippi Democrats
Mississippi lawyers
Mississippi state senators
Mississippi Whigs
People from Clarke County, Virginia
People from Lexington, Mississippi
People of Mississippi in the American Civil War
Signers of the Confederate States Constitution
Signers of the Provisional Constitution of the Confederate States
United States senators from Mississippi
University of Virginia alumni
Whig Party United States senators
19th-century American lawyers